Loretta Doyle (also known by her married name Cusack, born 12 July 1963) is a Scottish judoka who won the under-52kg event at the 1982 World Judo Championships, and the under-56 kg event at the 1990 Commonwealth Games. Doyle also won European Judo Championships titles in 1983 and 1992.

Career
Doyle started judo at the age of 10, and three years later, she joined the British Judo team. Doyle competed at the inaugural World Judo Championships for women in 1980. She was one of seven judoka at the event, and won a bronze medal. She came third at the 1980 European Judo Championships, and second at the 1981 and 1982 European Judo Championships. She won the under-52 kg title at the 1982 World Judo Championships. In 1983, Doyle won the under-52 kg event at the European Judo Championships in Genoa, Italy.  Doyle had to pay her own costs to compete at the 1984 World Judo Championships; she had to borrow the money from her father. In the Championships, Doyle suffered a separated shoulder and had to be taken to hospital.

Doyle came third in the judo demonstration event at the 1986 Commonwealth Games in Edinburgh, Scotland. That year, she lost the British Open Championships final to Sharon Rendle. Rendle was chosen instead of Doyle for the 1986 World Judo Championships. That year, Doyle also came third at the 1986 European Judo Championships event in London. Doyle lost in the first round of the 1989 European Judo Championships.

Doyle won the lightweight event (under-56 kg) at the 1990 Commonwealth Games, beating Australian Suzanne Williams in the final. It was Scotland's first judo medal at a Commonwealth Games. She came second in the under-52 kg event at the 1991 European Judo Championships, losing to Jessica Gal in the final. Doyle won the under-52 kg event at the 1992 European Judo Championships in Paris, France. Doyle was not selected for the 1992 Summer Olympics. In addition to her international success, she won eight British titles at the British Judo Championships.

After retiring, Doyle worked as a coach for the British Judo Association. In that role, Doyle coached Sally Conway. In 2019, she set up the Loretta Doyle Judo Foundation, to help fund young judo enthusiasts.

Personal life

Doyle was married to Billy Cusack, who won a bronze medal at the 1990 Commonwealth Games in the men's lightweight judo event; the pair were married before Doyle's appearance at the 1986 Commonwealth Games. The pair have two children, and Doyle found out that she was first pregnant when she went for a medical examination prior to the 1992 Olympic selection. She said she was disappointed not to be selected, but "delighted" that she was pregnant. The pair are now divorced.

References

External links
 
 Commonwealth Games Profile

1963 births
Living people
Scottish female judoka
British female judoka
British sports coaches
Commonwealth Games medallists in judo
Commonwealth Games gold medallists for Scotland
Judoka at the 1990 Commonwealth Games
Medallists at the 1990 Commonwealth Games